Beato is a freguesia (civil parish) and district of Lisbon, the capital of Portugal. Located in eastern Lisbon, Beato is to the west of Penha de França and south of Marvila and Areeiro. The population in 2011 was 12,737.

History
It was created in 1756 with the designation of São Bartolomeu do Beato.

Landmarks
Convent of Beato António
Palacio do Grilo

References

External links

 
Parishes of Lisbon